Purani Haveli  also known as Masarrat Mahal palace is a palace located in Hyderabad, Telangana, India. It was the official residence of the Nizam. It was also known as Haveli Khadeem, which means old mansion, was constructed for Sikander Jah, Asaf Jah III (1803–1829) by his father Ali Khan Bahadur, Asaf Jah II.

History 
The second Nizam of Hyderabad, Mir Nizam Ali Khan had taken over this from Rukunudhaulah of the Momin dynasty, in 1717. The main building is a symbol of 18th-century European architecture. His successor Sikander Jah lived here for some time and later shifted to Chowmahalla Palace. Due to this, these buildings are called Purani Haveli. In this building complex, Ayina Khaana (Mirror House) and Chini Khaana (Chinese Glass House) were constructed.

The sixth and seventh Nizams were born at this palace, and did spend a part of their life at this palace.

Now the South Zone Deputy Commissioner of Police (Hyderabad) and South Zone Task Force Police Addl DCP offices are being functioned here.

The Palace
The Haveli is "U" in shape, with two oblong wings running parallel to each other and the residential palace located perpendicularly in the centre. The main building resembles 18th-century European palaces. A unique feature of this palace is the world's longest wardrobe, built in two levels with a hand-cranked wooden lift(elevator) in place. This occupies the entire length of one oblong wing of the palace.

The Museum

The palace also houses the Nizam's museum, which is dedicated to the last Nizam of Hyderabad state. Currently the palace is being used as a school and as an Industrial training institute.

School 
Mukarram Jah School was established in 1987. It functions from five ancillary buildings which surround the main palace. It is a private school and it was ranked among the best budget private schools in the country.

See also
Chowmahalla Palace
Taramati Baradari
:Category:Establishments in Hyderabad State

References

External links

The state government's page about the Nizam's palaces
Exterior view of Purani Haveli Palace on Youtube
 Purani Haveli

Hyderabad State
Royal residences in India
Havelis
Palaces in Hyderabad, India
Tourist attractions in Hyderabad, India
Heritage structures in Hyderabad, India
Palaces of Nizams of Hyderabad